Your World Today is a daily international news-magazine television series that airs on CNN International, a sister cable-news channel to CNN. The show serves as a morning breakfast show for viewers in the Asia-Pacific region.

Production and format
Your World Today initially aired for up to four hours per day. It aired every day between 10:00 a.m. and 2:00 p.m Eastern Time. However, following the creation of programmes such as The Brief, Prism and International Desk, the weekday edition was reduced to sixty minutes, while the weekend edition aired for thirty minutes.  An additional edition of the program aired on Saturdays from  12:00 p.m., for thirty minutes.

Based at CNN's world headquarters in Atlanta, Georgia, the program featured reports worldwide by CNN correspondents and affiliates.

It included regular business updates from New York City and London, sports and weather updates as well as covering all the live and breaking news.

In 2019, CNNI relaunched the show with anchors Isa Soares and Cyril Vanier. The program is now based in the network's London bureau. It airs from 12:00 a.m. and 2:00 a.m BST with cut-ins for World Sport and is aimed as a morning news program for viewers in the Asia-Pacific region.

Anchors in 2019
 Isa Soares
 Cyril Vanier

Anchors in 2009
Jonathan Mann
Colleen McEdwards
Rosemary Church (Weekends)

Previous Anchors
Hala Gorani
Zain Verjee
Daljit Dhaliwal
Tumi Makgabo
Jim Clancy
Rosemary Church (Weekdays)
Ralitsa Vassileva

Simulcast on CNN
An edition of the program in the 12:00 p.m. time slot was previously simulcast on CNN, making it one of the few shows in cable television to be broadcast in over 200 countries and territories.  In September 2008, CNN Newsroom took over the program's hour timeslot on CNN.

2020
In the midst of the COVID-19 pandemic, the program has been placed off air and replaced with The Situation Room with Wolf Blitzer.

Replacement
The program was replaced by World Report (CNN) and International Desk as part of CNN International's relaunch in September 2009.

References

External links
cnn.com/CNN/Programs/ywt, descriptive paragraph on program at cnn.com, CNN's official website

2002 American television series debuts
2009 American television series endings
2000s American television news shows
CNN original programming
English-language television shows